Marek Heinz (born 4 August 1977) is a Czech former professional football striker.

Career

Early career
Heinz started his football career in his native Czech Republic, where he played for Lázně Bohdaneč and  Sigma Olomouc before moving to Germany in 2000.

Germany and international call-up
Heinz headed to German side Hamburger SV in 2000, the same year making his first appearance for the senior team of the Czech Republic. A surplus to requirement under Kurt Jara midway through the 2002–03 season he joined Arminia Bielefeld for the remainder of the campaign. Heinz could not make himself a regular at Bielefeld, watching his side slumping to relegation from the Bundesliga. Having not been signed by Bielefeld and released by Hamburg, he returned to the Czech Republic in 2003.

Return to the Czech Republic and Euro 2004
Baník Ostrava signed Heinz in 2003 and the player enjoyed a fantastic run during 2003–04, leading Baník to the Czech title and ending up as top scorer of the Czech league himself, scoring 19 goals. He went on to play in Euro 2004, where the Czech Republic reached the semi-finals.

Back to Germany
Heinz moved back to Germany when Borussia Mönchengladbach signed him in August 2004, but he only stayed at Mönchengladbach for just over a year, as he headed to Turkish side Galatasaray SK in 2005.

In 2005, Heinz scored two crucial goals for his country and club. He first helped Galatasaray to a 4–1 win over rivals Trabzonspor in October, before he scored the all-important third goal against Finland which sent the Czechs into the 2006 World Cup held in Germany.

France
In September 2006, he signed a one-year contract with French side AS Saint-Étienne after being released by Galatasaray, hoping to finally making an impact at club level outside the Czech Republic. In August 2007, he signed with FC Nantes. On 30 September 2008, he moved to 1. FC Brno. After only one season Heinz left Brno, and on 29 June 2009 it was announced that he signed a one-year contract with Kapfenberger SV.

Return to Olomouc
Heinz returned to Olomouc in 2011, signing a two-year contract with the club. Despite playing 20 matches in his first season, Heinz played just seventeen minutes in one substitute appearance in the first half of his second season. In November 2012 manager Roman Pivarník announced Heinz was surplus to requirements and free to find another club. He joined second league 1. SC Znojmo on loan in January 2013 for the rest of the season.

Career statistics
Sources:

References

External links
 
 
 
 Marek Heinz at HLSZ 
 

1977 births
Living people
Czech people of German descent
Sportspeople from Olomouc
Association football forwards
Czech footballers
AFK Atlantic Lázně Bohdaneč players
SK Sigma Olomouc players
Hamburger SV players
Arminia Bielefeld players
Dukla Prague footballers
FC Baník Ostrava players
Borussia Mönchengladbach players
Galatasaray S.K. footballers
AS Saint-Étienne players
FC Nantes players
FC Zbrojovka Brno players
Kapfenberger SV players
Ferencvárosi TC footballers
1. SC Znojmo players
Czech First League players
Bundesliga players
Süper Lig players
Ligue 1 players
Ligue 2 players
Austrian Football Bundesliga players
Nemzeti Bajnokság I players
Czech Republic youth international footballers
Czech Republic under-21 international footballers
Czech Republic international footballers
Olympic footballers of the Czech Republic
Footballers at the 2000 Summer Olympics
UEFA Euro 2004 players
2006 FIFA World Cup players
Expatriate footballers in Germany
Expatriate footballers in Turkey
Expatriate footballers in France
Expatriate footballers in Austria
Expatriate footballers in Hungary
Czech expatriate footballers
Czech expatriate sportspeople in Germany
Czech expatriate sportspeople in France
Czech expatriate sportspeople in Austria
Czech expatriate sportspeople in Turkey
Czech expatriate sportspeople in Hungary